The men's marathon at the 2022 World Athletics Championships was held in Eugene on 17 July 2022.

Records
Before the competition records were as follows:

Qualification standard
The standard to qualify automatically for entry was 2:11:30.

Schedule
The event schedule, in local time (UTC−7), was as follows:

Results 

The final started on 17 July at 06:15.

References

Marathon
Marathons at the World Athletics Championships